Jamia Wilson (born October 10, 1980) is an American writer, commentator, and feminist activist based in New York City. She is currently Vice President & Executive Editor at Random House and was formerly the Director and Publisher of the Feminist Press at CUNY. Wilson was the youngest director in the Press's history, as well as the first woman of color to head the organization. Prior to joining the Feminist Press, Wilson was the Executive Director of Women, Action, and the Media and a staff writer at Rookie (magazine).

Background
Jamia Wilson was born in the Southern U.S and grew up as an expat in Saudi Arabia. In 2002 she graduated from American University with a B.A. in communications, and has received her M.A. in Humanities and Social Thought at New York University.

She was a member of the third cohort of the Move to End Violence social change movement. She was an Executive Director of Youth Tech Health, and was a TED Prize Storyteller, and former President of Programs at The Women’s Media Center. In 2013 she was named among the "17 Faces of the Future of Feminism" by Reinery29.

She is married to jazz saxophonist and Travis Sullivan's Bjorkestra band leader Travis Sullivan.

Works

Books
 Wilson, Jamia. "Roadmap for Revolutionaries: Resistance, Activism & Advocacy for All"
 Wilson, Jamia. "Young Gifted and Black"
 Wilson, Jamia. "Together We Rise: The Women's March Behind The Scenes At The Protest Heard Around The World"
 Wilson, Jamia. "Step Into Your Power"

Contributions to academic publications
 Signs Journal

References

External links

1980 births
Living people
American commentators
American feminist writers
American University alumni
New York University alumni
21st-century American women writers